Taylor Run is a small tributary of Slippery Rock Creek in western Pennsylvania.  The stream rises in southern Mercer County near Drake and flows south into Lawrence County entering Slippery Rock Creek upstream of Harlansburg, Pennsylvania. The watershed is roughly 60% agricultural, 30% forested and the rest is other uses.

See also
 List of rivers of Pennsylvania

References

Rivers of Pennsylvania
Tributaries of the Beaver River
Rivers of Lawrence County, Pennsylvania
Rivers of Mercer County, Pennsylvania